The Matsu Folk Culture Museum or Matsu Folk Cultural Artifacts Exhibition Hall is a museum in Nangan Township, Lienchiang County, Fujian Province, Republic of China.

History
The museum was originally built in 1974. In 1983, the museum building was rebuilt and underwent renovation in 2002.

Architecture
The museum building is designed with a traditional Matsu village and Eastern Fujian style and is located in a five-story building to display local cultural artifacts to the visitors coming to the museum.

Exhibitions
The ground floor of the museum displays the archeology of Liangdao Austronesian culture. The two middle floors display the agriculture, fishing and life of local people. The top most floor displays an artwork gallery.

Notable events
 1st Lienchiang Cross-Strait Matters Forum

See also
 List of museums in Taiwan

References

1974 establishments in Taiwan
Art museums and galleries in Taiwan
Buildings and structures completed in 1983
Museums established in 1974
Museums in Lienchiang County
Nangang Township